The University of Priština is a public university in Kosovo with a temporary seat in North Mitrovica.

It is the post-secondary institution that emerged after the disestablishment of the Serbian-language University of Pristina as a result of the Kosovo War. Despite its official name, it is also referred to as the University of Kosovska Mitrovica after its temporary relocation to North Mitrovica in 2001.

History

The original university (University of Priština) was established in the city of Priština, SAP Kosovo, Socialist Republic of Serbia, SFR Yugoslavia, for the academic year 1969–70 and functioned until 1999. In 1999, it consisted of 14 faculties with around 18,000 students and over 1,300 faculty and staff members. However, owing to political upheaval, war, successive mutual expulsions of faculty of one ethnicity or the other, and resultant pervasive ethnic-based polarization, currently, there are two separate, disjoint institutions, both using the same name, albeit each notated idiosyncratically, to reflect their polarized ethnic identity and divergent physical locations, separate Albanian and Serbian entities.

The University of Priština headquartered in Kosovska Mitrovica is a Serbian entity displaced from the city of Priština in 1999, conducting education in Serbian language, backed by the Government of Serbia (recognized by United Nations Interim Administration Mission in Kosovo (UNMIK) since 2002 but under the name University of Mitrovica)  having taken up physical residence in North Mitrovica, a city in the northern ethnically Serbian region of Kosovo. The other entity bearing the name of the original university is University of Pristina with headquarters in Pristina, run by Government of Kosovo.

Following the end of the Kosovo War in 1999, the Kosovo Serb University of Priština relocated to Central Serbia (from 1999 to 2001 the seat was in Kruševac) and around 6,000 students transferred to other universities in Serbia. From 1999 to 2001, around 2,000 students graduated from the University of Priština, 50 students was awarded Magister degrees, and 20 earned their doctorates.

In 2001, the university relocated to its present-day location in North Kosovo. After moving back to Kosovo only 6,500 students continued their education at the university. In 2004, the university had 10 faculties with about 8,000 students and enrollment quota of 1,200 students. In August 2007 it had 9,320 students, over 700 faculty and about 200 staff members. Its enrollment quota was 2,726 students. About 45% were from Kosovo, 30% from Serbia, 25% from Montenegro. There was also a smaller number of students from North Macedonia and Bosnia and Herzegovina.

The university is a member of the Conference of the Universities of Serbia (KONUS) and European University Association and has established cooperations with the Balkan Universities Network and numerous institutions worldwide (France, Russia, Italy, Norway, Oman, Ireland, UK.).

As of 2011 there were 10,264 students, 730 faculty, and 320 staff members. For 2018–19 school year, a total of 1,013 students enrolled on the first year of studies at the university.

Organization

Faculties
The academic year runs from 1 October through 30 September, organized in two semesters, with 30 weeks of teaching per year. There are 10 faculties within the university, of which six are located in North Mitrovica, three in Leposavić and one in Zvečan.

Notable alumni and faculty members
 Radmila Bakočević, Yugoslavian opera singer
 Ljuba Brkić, president of Jeunesses Musicales Serbia
 Izudin Čavrković, Bosnian-Serbian trumpeter
 Vladimir Koh, Serbian violinist
 Vojna Nešić, Serbian-Bosnian composer
 Peko Nikčević, Montenegrin sculptor
 Jasmina Novokmet, Serbian conductor
 Marko Savić, Serbian pianist and piano teacher
 Haris Silajdžić, President of Bosnia and Herzegovina, former professor of Arabic
 Milenko Stefanović, European clarinetist
 Sanja Stijačić, Serbian-Bosnian-Montenegrin flutist
 Jovan Šajnović, Yugoslavian conductor
 Tomislav Trifić, Serbian graphic artist
 Andrijana Videnović, Serbian theater and movie actress
 Jorgovanka Tabaković, Serbian politician and the current Governor of NBS
Goran Rakić, politician and the current Deputy Prime Minister of Kosovo
Igor Simić, deputy in the Assembly of the Republic of Kosovo

See also

 Education in Serbia
 List of universities in Serbia
 List of split up universities

Notes and references
Notes:

References:

External links 
  
 University of Infostud
 Page on the University on the website Students of the world
 Page on the website of the University KosovoiMetohija.org
 Education in Kosovo and Metohija
 Website of the Faculty of Arts at the University of Pristina
 Website of the Medical Faculty of the University of Pristina
 Website of Economics faculty, University of Pristina 
 Website of the Faculty of Physical Education at the University of Pristina
 Website of the Law Faculty of the University of Pristina
 Website of the Faculty of Engineering, University of Pristina
 Website of the Faculty of Philosophy, University of Pristina
 Website of Agriculture, University of Pristina
 Website of Teaching Faculty of the University of Pristina
 Website of Mathematics Faculty of the University of Pristina

Serbian culture

Educational institutions established in 1999
1999 establishments in Yugoslavia
1999 establishments in Kosovo
Law schools in Yugoslavia
North Mitrovica
District of Mitrovica
North Mitrovica